Stanna en stund was released on 3 April 2000 and is a compilation album from Swedish "dansband" Lotta Engbergs.

Track listing
Åh, vad jag älskade dig just då   
Lyckliga gatan
Om jag bara kunde
Var rädda om kärleken
Ta mig med till världens ände
När jag vilar i din famn
Tjejer & snubbar, kärringar & gubbar
Sången han sjöng var min egen
Någonting är på gång
Stanna en stund
Det finns ingenting att hämta
Börjar dagen med en sång

2000 compilation albums